Geneviève Gabrielle Grad (born 5 July 1944 in Paris) is a French actress. She played Nicole Cruchot, the daughter of police officer Ludovic Cruchot (Louis de Funès) in the first three films of the Gendarme of Saint-Tropez series from 1964 to 1968. She has, among others, played in two films with Paul Guers as his partner: Flash Love (1972) and Libertés sexuelles (1977). She has also appeared in several made for TV films and TV series in the 1960s and 1970s. She had a son with Igor Bogdanoff. She has been married to Jean René André Yvon Guillaume since March 19, 1993. She lives in Vendôme in the Loir-et-Cher.

Filmography 

 1961 : Un soir sur la plage 
 1961 : Captain Fracasse 
 1962 : The Centurion
 1962 : 
 1962 : Attack of the Normans
 1962 : L'Empire de la nuit
 1963 : Hercules vs. Moloch
 1963 : The Beast of Babylon Against the Son of Hercules
 1963 : Sandokan the Great
 1964 : Gibraltar
 1964 : The Troops of St. Tropez
 1964 : L'Enlèvement d'Antoine Bigut (TV)
 1965 : Chambre à louer (TV)
 1965 : Frédéric le gardian (TV)
 1965 : Gendarme in New York
 1966 : Su nombre es Daphne
 1967 : Le Fossé
 1967 : Quand la liberté venait du ciel (TV)
 1967 : Au théâtre ce soir : Ami-ami
 1968 : Le Démoniaque : Lise
 1968 : Le gendarme se marie
 1969 : Agence intérim (TV)
 1970 : The Palace of Angels
 1970 : OSS 117 Takes a Vacation 
 1972 : Flash Love
 1975 : Au théâtre ce soir : La moitié du plaisir
 1977 : Libertés sexuelles 
 1977 : Le Maestro 
 1978 : Voltaire (or Ce diable d'homme) (TV)
 1980 : Comme une femme : La sœur d'Olivier
 1980 : La Vie des autres (TV)
 1980 : La Pharisienne (TV) 
 1980 : Voulez-vous un bébé Nobel? 
 1983 : Ça va pas être triste

References

External links
 
  Geneviève Grad sur Allociné
  Biosstars

Living people
1944 births
French film actresses
French television actresses
Actresses from Paris
20th-century French actresses